CSK VMF Moscow is the navy section of the multi-sport club CSKA Moscow and its water polo men's team. It won the LEN Champions League, the LEN Super Cup and the LEN Cup Winners' Cup.

Sports Complex CSK VMF
The complex is located in Moscow on the banks of the Khimki reservoir.  The CSK VMF sports complex includes: a 50-meter swimming pool, an indoor rowing pool, strength training gyms, a game gym, indoor tennis courts, volleyball and basketball courts, moorings for ships, boats and sports vessels, a sports training base in  Serebryany Bor.

Honours

Domestic 
Soviet League
 Winners (21) (record): 1944–45, 1945–46, 1948–49, 1953–54, 1963–64, 1964–65, 1965–66, 1969–70, 1970–71, 1974–75, 1975–76, 1976–77, 1977–78, 1979–80, 1982–83, 1983–84, 1987–88, 1988–89, 1989–90, 1990–91, 1991–92
Soviet Cup
 Winners (7) (record): 1976–77, 1979–80, 1981–82, 1982–83, 1983–84, 1986–87, 1988–89
Russian League
 Winners (1): 1992–93
 Runners-up (2): 1993–94, 1998–99
Russian Cup
 Winners (1): 1992–93

European 
 LEN Champions League
 Winners (1): 1976–77
 Runners-up (2): 1977–78, 1984–85
 LEN Cup Winners' Cup
 Winners (2): 1980–81, 1982–83
 LEN Super Cup
 Winners (3): 1977, 1981, 1983

Individual club awards
Triple Crown
 Winners (1): 1976–77
 Double
 Winners (5): 1979–80, 1982–83, 1983–84, 1988–89, 1992–93

External links 
 Official site

Water polo clubs in Russia
Water polo clubs in the Soviet Union
CSKA Moscow